Suspect Symmetry is the second full-length album by Canadian metalcore band Buried Inside. It was first released on Cyclop Media on September 1, 2001, and is now also available on the band's current label, Relapse Records.

Track listing

Credits
Arranged By [Cello & Viola], Cello, Viola – M. Molnar*
Artwork By [Design & Construction] – Matias
Bass, Vocals – Steve*
Engineer [Assistant] – A. Edkins
Guitar – Matias*
Guitar, Piano, Vocals – Andrew Tweedy
Mastered By – Alan Douches
Percussion – Mike*
Photography [Cityscape] – N. Shaw
Photography [Live] – M. Cumming, G. Digitaeno & S. Scallen .Com
Recorded By, Edited By, Programmed By, Mixed By – A. Tweedy*
Vocals [Additional] – M. Ethier*, S. Reiss
Vocals, Gong – Nick*
Written-By, Arranged By, Performer – Buried Inside

Notes
Recorded, edited, programmed & mixed May 2001 @ Raven Street Studios. 
Mastered @ West West Side Music, NJ.
All songs © 2001 Buried Inside.

2001 albums
Buried Inside albums
Cyclop Media albums